Teresa Skrzek (born in 1957) is a Polish former pair skater. With her skating partner, Piotr Sczypa, she became a three-time Polish national champion. The pair competed at five ISU Championships – five European Championships and two World Championships. Their skating club was Naprzód Janów.

Competitive highlights 
with Sczypa

References 

1957 births
Polish female pair skaters
Living people
Place of birth missing (living people)